Umanatha Kotian is a Bharatiya Janata Party political activist and member of the Karnataka Legislative Assembly from the Moodabidri constituency.

References

External links 
Umanatha Kotian affidavit

Bharatiya Janata Party politicians from Karnataka
Karnataka MLAs 2018–2023
Year of birth missing (living people)
Karnataka politicians
Living people